Diana Schuler (born 18 April 1981) is a German snooker player. Schuler started playing pool at the age of 14 in her friend's aunt's café. and took up snooker in 2010. In April 2015, Schuler was appointed as a board member and as the Marketing Director of World Women's Snooker. Her highest ranking in the World Women's Snooker rankings has been 8th.

She ran a vintage clothing and accessories e-commerce business for 15 years, and is now an E-Commerce Manager for company in Germany

Schuler beat Daniel Dieudonne 4-3 and Ronni Beniesch 4-0 before losing 0–4 to Anthony Hamilton at the Euro Players Tour Championship 2010/2011 – Event 1.

Mark Williams made an official maximum break during his 4–0 defeat of Schuler at the Euro Players Tour Championship 2010/2011 – Event 3.

References

External links
World Women's Snooker profile

Living people
1981 births
Female snooker players
People from Saarbrücken